The A-138 is a road belonging to the autonomic road network of Aragon, Spain.  It connects France at the Tunnel of Bielsa-Aragnouet with Barbastro and the N-240.

External links
Carretera A-138 in Google Maps

Transport in Aragon